Değerli is a village in the Yüksekova District of Hakkâri Province in Turkey. The village had a population of 1,065 in 2021. The four hamlets of Aşağıölçek, Dişli, Köycük and Yukarıölçek are attached to it.

History 
It was populated by 13 Assyrian families in 1850 and 17 families in 1877.

Population 
Population history from 2000 to 2022:

References 

Villages in Yüksekova District
Kurdish settlements in Hakkâri Province
Historic Assyrian communities in Turkey